No innovation without representation is a democratic ideal of ensuring that everyone involved gets a chance to be represented fairly in technological developments. Political philosopher of technology Langdon Winner states that groups and social interests likely to be affected by a particular kind of technological change ought to be represented at an early stage in defining exactly what that technology will be. It is the idea that relevant parties have a say in technological developments and are not left in the dark. It has been spoken about by political scientist Massimiano Bucchi. This ideal does not require the public to become experts on the topics of science and engineering, it only asks that the opinions and ideas be heard before making drastic decisions, as talked about by Steven L. Goldman.

Arguments for no innovation without representation
Arguments for no innovation without representation stated by Carl Mitcham:
 Experts cannot escape public influence. There will always be influence from corporations or outside sources. "Technoscientific decision making is never neutral or objective."
 Public participation will have a more beneficial long-term effect than no participation. "Without public participation nothing will get done"
 Experts promote their own self-interest at the expense of the public. Justification of modern technology is that it is designed to promote human welfare.
 Those that are affected by technological decisions should have a say in what affects them.
 Moral autonomy is necessary. This is when "persons find their moral agency abridged when decisions that affect their lives are made heteronomously by others."
 Public participation will lead to better outcomes. The idea that the majority will make the decision that has the most positive impact on technology or themselves.
 Education through participation is necessary. Individuals will only become more intelligent through participation.
 Currently there is a lack of strong moral consensus. People have different feelings and different opinions and participation of a greater population will have the greatest positive effect on society.

Examples of when innovation without representation was unnecessary

Not all technology needs equal structural influence. Giving weight to the fact that one should not have to defend every decision they make to a large committee or formalized group (“Every time someone is moved to buy a fork or to sell a pencil sharpener"), it would be a distraction from important technological advances, as well as a misuse of resources, to poll everyone involved. Technology that is already developed without controversy is part of our social principle and not something where it is democratically necessary to go about evaluation for use in general life. The primary consideration of democratic innovation is for those instances that affect a large level and hold influences beyond ethnic value.

"Rule by democratic elites is more democratic than thick democratic participation – in the sense that it is more likely, at least in theory, to protect civil liberties and minority rights."  A great example is that the Bill of Rights, arguably one of the most important documents in American history, was developed by a group of experts who were looking out for the common goal of the majority population. A participatory democracy involving the consideration and opinions of everyone involved, at the time could have taken years to implement, as well as would have been more suited towards white, rich, land owners rather than the majority population.

Examples of when it was not implemented

"The very existence of a commercial nuclear power industry is itself a consequence, neither of the nuclear science and engineering knowledge bases available in the 1950s, nor of a perceived need on the part of U.S. utilities for alternatives to coal, oil, and natural gas, but of deliberate federal policy decisions." Action was taken by the Truman and Eisenhower administrations, the Atomic Energy Commission, and the Congressional Joint Committee on Atomic Energy to commercialize nuclear technologies. This decision was made without consulting a greater scale of opinions specifically nuclear engineers related to outside sources. The currently functioning commercial nuclear power plants in the United States are light water reactors, which set the standard for size of power plants, and were the direct result of government funded facilities such as General Electric and Westinghouse. The current thirty-five year old commitment and billions of dollars of federal funds into nuclear and fusion research continues to grow as nuclear waste and more sustainable and egalitarian programs go unfunded.

Examples of when it was implemented

In 1970 Northwest Canada was found to have an abundance of natural gas. Rather than allowing pipelines to be built with no regard to the Indian tribes living there, a Canadian Supreme Court justice, Thomas Burger, arranged community hearings. These hearings took place to allow both investors of the pipeline as well as the Indians who would be directly affected by its construction to come forward with their concerns and evidence for their reasoning's. The judge believed that everyone's point should be respectfully considered, and to further prove this he arranged over 30 meetings in remote settings and provided transportation to those interested in attending. In addition, media radio coverage was provided in French, English, and Native languages, which allowed people to understand multiple sides of concerns and the process that was taking place. Ultimately it was decided to reroute the pipeline to follow existing highways rather than cutting through Native lands.

Future changes

According to Richard Sclove, there are two main reasons for why the democratic system will be most effective when cultural pluralism is seen as an important factor in community success. "First, equal respect for people entails respecting their cultural heritage. To undermine a culture corrodes the social bases of its members’ sense of self and purpose. Second, all people share an interest in living in a society and a world  many cultures."

These ideals further divide into the ideas that follow

 Decentralization of government systems brings stronger small scale power which allow for decision to be made by those whom it directly applies. This is "because of distinctive and unescapable physical and moral interdependencies."
 Community differences give people the opportunity to experience life with more variety at a more frequent manor. Giving opportunity for cultural sabbaticals allows for embrace these variations.
 Accepting variations fosters more social thinkers allowing them to reach a wider range of people and systems thus balancing respect among the community thus balancing the protection of all cultures.

Innovation with representation will truly be reached when respect for all becomes the first component to uphold in decision making. Following these ideals open doors of perception of which cast potential on more controlled innovation through those of which it ultimately fosters.

See also 
 
 Appropriate technology

References

Sociology of science